Pollen is a powdery substance in plant reproduction.

Pollen may also refer to:

People
 Arabella Rosalind Hungerford Pollen, an English couturier and author
 Arthur Pollen, a writer on naval affairs 
 Daniel Pollen, the ninth Premier of New Zealand
 Francis Pollen, English architect
 Geir Pollen, a Norwegian poet, novelist and translator
 John Hungerford Pollen (1820–1902), English writer on crafts  and furniture
 John Hungerford Pollen (1858–1925), English Jesuit, known as a historian of the Protestant Reformation
 Ole Petter Pollen, a Norwegian sailor
 Peregrine Pollen (1931–2020), an English auctioneer, father of Arabella Pollen.
 Pollen Ndlanya, a retired South African football player

Art and entertainment
 Pollen (band), an American power pop band
 Pollen (novel), a 1995 science fiction novel by Jeff Noon
 Pollen (film), a 2011 documentary film by Disneynature
 Pollen (album), a 2023 album by musical duo Tennis
 Pollen (video game), a sci-fi video game

Other uses
 Pet pollen, or dander, material shed from the body of various animals
 Pollen Island, island in New Zealand
 Pollèn, Italy, a town in Italy
 Pollen (programming language), a Turing-complete programming language based on XML
 Pollen (publishing system), an extension of the Racket programming language macros.

See also
 Polen (disambiguation)
 Pollin